Wila Ch'ankha (Aymara wila red, ch'ankha wool cord, "red cord", Hispanicized spelling Wila Chanca) is a  mountain located in the Andes in Bolivia. It is situated in the Oruro Department, Poopó Province, Poopó Municipality, Poopó Canton, near the Desaguadero River and northeast of Poopó Lake. The town of Poopó lies at the foot of the mountain, north of it.

References 

Mountains of Oruro Department